The 2009 Argentine winter heat wave was a period of unusual and exceptionally hot weather that arrived at the end of the winter on August 2009 in Argentina. Several provinces of the country were most affected. Several records were broken. August 2009 was the warmest month since official measurements began.
On 30 August 2009, it felt like the middle of summer late last week in the heart of Argentina even with the calendar showing more than three weeks remaining in the Southern Hemisphere winter. 

Even though normal high temperatures for late August are near , readings topped  degrees at midweek, then topped out above  degrees during the weekend. 

Elsewhere in Argentina, the mid-northern city of Córdoba reached a dramatic high of  degrees on 29 August 2009.

See also
 July 2007 Argentine winter storm

Notes 

Climate of Argentina
Argentine winter heat wave, 2009 August
2009 in Argentina
Heat wave
Heat waves in South America